Bibliotheca historica is a work of universal history by Diodorus Siculus. It consisted of forty books, which were divided into three sections. The first six books are geographical in theme, and describe the history and culture of Egypt (book I), of Mesopotamia, India, Scythia, and Arabia (II), of North Africa (III), and of Greece and Europe (IV–VI). In the next section (books VII–XVII), he recounts human history starting with the Trojan War, down to the death of Alexander the Great. The last section (books XVII to the end) concern the historical events from the successors of Alexander down to either 60 BC or the beginning of Caesar's Gallic War in 59 BC. (The end has been lost, so it is unclear whether Diodorus reached the beginning of the Gallic War, as he promised at the beginning of his work, or, as evidence suggests, old and tired from his labors he stopped short at 60 BC.) He selected the name "Bibliotheca" in acknowledgement that he was assembling a composite work from many sources. Of the authors he drew from, some who have been identified include: Hecataeus of Abdera, Ctesias of Cnidus, Ephorus, Theopompus, Hieronymus of Cardia, Duris of Samos, Diyllus, Philistus, Timaeus, Polybius and Posidonius.

Diodorus' immense work has not survived intact; only the first five books and books 11 through 20 remain. The rest exists only in fragments preserved in Photius and the Excerpta of Constantine Porphyrogenitus.

Chronology
[[File:Augustus Statue.JPG|thumb|upright|The Bibliotheca'''s history was completed sometime between 36 and 30 BC, during the period of the Second Triumvirate and Octavian's victory over Mark Antony and Cleopatra VII.|alt=]]

The earliest date Diodorus mentions is his visit to Egypt in the 180th Olympiad (between 60 and 56 BC). This visit was marked by his witnessing an angry mob demand the death of a Roman citizen who had accidentally killed a cat, an animal sacred to the ancient Egyptians (Bibliotheca historica 1.41, 1.83). The latest event Diodorus mentions is Octavian's vengeance on the city of Tauromenium, whose refusal to help him led to Octavian's naval defeat nearby in 36 BC (16.7). Diodorus shows no knowledge that Egypt became a Roman province—which transpired in 30 BC—so presumably he published his completed work before that event. Diodorus asserts that he devoted thirty years to the composition of his history, and that he undertook a number of dangerous journeys through Europe and Asia in prosecution of his historical researches.

Structure

In the Bibliotheca historica, Diodorus sets out to write a universal history, covering the entire world and all periods of time. Each book opens with a table of its contents and a preface discussing the relevance of history, issues in the writing of history or the significance of the events discussed in that book. These are now generally agreed to be entirely Diodorus' own work. The degree to which the text that follows is derived from earlier historical works is debated.

The first five books describe the history and culture of different regions, without attempting to determine the relative chronology of events. Diodorus expresses serious doubts that such chronology is possible for barbarian lands and the distant past. The resulting books have affinities with the genre of geography. Books six to ten, which covered the transition from mythical times to the archaic period, are almost entirely lost. By book ten he had taken up an annalistic structure, narrating all the events throughout the world in each year before moving on to the next one. Books eleven to twenty, which are completely intact and cover events between 480 BC and 302 BC, maintain this annalistic structure. Books twenty-one to forty, which brought the work down to Diodorus' own lifetime, terminating around 60 BC, are mostly lost.

Book I: Egypt

Book one opens with a prologue on the work as a whole, arguing for the importance of history generally and universal history in particular. The rest of the book is devoted to Egypt and is divided into two halves. In the first half he covers the origin of the world and the development of civilisation in Egypt. A long discussion of the theories offered by different Greek scholars to explain the annual floods of the River Nile serves to showcase Diodorus' wide-reading. In the second half he presents the history of the country, its customs and religion, in a highly respectful tone. His main sources are believed to be Hecataeus of Abdera and Agatharchides of Cnidus.

Book II: Asia 

This book has only a short prologue outlining its contents. The majority of the book is devoted to the history of the Assyrians, focussed on the mythical conquests of Ninus and Semiramis, the fall of the dynasty under the effeminate Sardanapallus, and the origins of the Medes who overthrew them. This section is explicitly derived from the account of Ctesias of Cnidus (chapters 1-34). The rest of the book is devoted to describing the various other peoples of Asia. He first describes India, drawing on Megasthenes (chapters 35-42), then the Scythians of the Eurasian steppe, including the Amazons and the Hyperboreans (chapters 43-47), and Arabia Felix (chapters 48-54). He finishes the book with an account of the traveller Iambulus' journey to a group of islands in the Indian Ocean, which appears to be based on a Hellenistic utopian novel.

Book III: Africa
In this book, Diodorus describes the geography of North Africa including Ethiopia, the gold mines of Egypt, the Persian Gulf and Libya, where he sites mythical figures including the Gorgons, Amazons, Ammon and Atlas. Based on the writings on Agatharchides, Diodorus describes gold mining in Egypt, with horrible working conditions:

Book IV: Greek mythology

In this book, Diodorus describes the mythology of Greece. He narrates the myths of Dionysus, Priapus, the Muses, Herakles, the Argonauts, Medea, the hero Theseus and the Seven against Thebes.

Book V: Europe

In this book, Diodorus describes the geography of Europe. He covers the islands of Sicily, Malta, Corsica, Sardinia and the Balearic Islands. He then covers Britain, 'Basilea', Gaul, the Iberian peninsula, and the regions of Liguria and Tyrrhenia in the Italian peninsula. Finally he describes the islands of H|iera and Panchaea in the southern ocean, and the Greek islands.

Books VI–X: Trojan War and Archaic Greece 
Books VI–X survive only in fragments, which cover events before and after the Trojan War including the stories of Bellerophon, Orpheus, Aeneas, and Romulus; some history from cities including Rome and Cyrene; tales of kings such as Croesus and Cyrus; and mentions of philosophers such as Pythagoras and Zeno.

Book XI: 480-451 BC 
This book has no prologue, just a brief statement of its contents.

The main focus of the book are events in mainland Greece, principally the Second Persian invasion of Greece under Xerxes (1-19, 27-39), Themistocles' construction of the Peiraeus and Long walls and his defection to Persia (41-50, 54-59) and the Pentecontaetia (60-65, 78–84, 88). Interweaved with this is an account of events in Sicily, focussing on Gelon of Syracuse's war with the Carthaginians (20-26), his successors' prosperity and fall (51, 53, 67-68), and the Syracusans' war with Ducetius (76, 78, 88-92).

Diodorus' source for his account of mainland Greece in this book is generally agreed to be Ephorus of Cyme, but some scholars argue that he supplemented this using the accounts of Herodotus, Thucydides, and others.

Book XII: 450-416 BC
The book's prologue muses on the mutability of fortune. Diodorus notes that bad events can have positive outcomes, like the prosperity of Greece which (he says) resulted from the Persian Wars.

Diodorus account mostly focuses on mainland Greece, covering the end of the Pentecontaetia (1-7, 22, 27-28), the first half of the Peloponnesian War (30, 31–34, 38–51, 55–63, 66-73), and conflicts during the Peace of Nicias (74-84). Most of the side narratives concern events in southern Italy, relating to the foundation of Thurii (9-21, 23, 35) and the secession of the Plebs at Rome (24-25). An account of the war between Leontini and Syracuse, culminating in the embassy of Gorgias to Athens (54-56), sets up the account of the Sicilian Expedition in book XIII.

Diodorus is believed to have continued to use Ephorus, perhaps supplemented with other historians, as his source for Greek events in this book, while the source for the events in western Greece is usually identified as Timaeus of Tauromenium.

Book XIII: 415-404 BC
Diodorus explains that, given the amount of material to be covered, his prologue must be brief.

This book opens with the account of the Sicilian Expedition, culminating in two very long speeches at Syracuse deliberating about how to treat the Athenian prisoners (1-33). After that the two areas again diverge, with the Greek narrative covering the Decelean War down to the battles of Arginusae and Aigospotami (35-42, 45–53, 64–74, 76-79). The Sicilian narrative recounts the beginning of the Second Carthaginian War, culminating in the rise of Dionysius the Elder to the tyranny (43-44, 54–63, 75, 80–96, 108-114).

Ephorus is generally agreed to have continued to be the source of the Greek narrative and Timaeus of the Sicilian narrative. The source of the Sicilian expedition is disputed - both Ephorus and Timaeus have been put forward. Sacks argues that the two speeches at the end of that account are Diodorus' own work.

Book XIV: 404-387 BC
In the prologue, Diodorus identifies reproachful criticism (blasphemia) as the punishment for evil deeds which people take to heart the most and which the powerful are especially subject to. Powerful men, therefore, should avoid evil deeds in order to avoid receiving this reproach from posterity. Diodorus claims that the central subjects of the book are negative examples, who demonstrate the truth of these remarks.

The book is again divided into Greek and Sicilian narratives. The Greek narrative covers the thirty tyrants of Athens (3-6, 32-33), the establishment and souring of the Spartan hegemony (10-13, 17, 34–36, 38), Cyrus the Younger's attempt to seize the Persian throne with the aid of the Ten Thousand (19-31), Agesilaus' invasion of Persian Asia Minor (79-80), the Boeotian War (81-86, 91–92, 94).

The Sicilian narrative focusses on Dionysios the Elder's establishment of his tyranny in Sicily (7-9, 11–16, 18), his second war with the Carthaginians (41-78, 85–91, 95-96), and his invasion of southern Italy (100-108, 111-112).

Fairly brief notes mention Roman affairs year by year, including the war with Veii (93), and the Gallic Sack (113-117).

Ephorus and Timaeus are assumed to have still been Diodorus' sources.

Book XV: 386-361 BC
In the prologue of this book, Diodorus makes several statements that have been considered important for understanding the philosophy behind his entire work. Firstly, he announces the importance of parrhesia (free speech) for the overall moral goal of his work, insofar as he expects his frank praise of good people and criticism of bad ones will encourage his readers to behave morally. Secondly, he declares that the fall of the Spartan empire, which is described in this book, was caused by their cruel treatment of their subjects. Sacks considers this idea about the fall of empires to be a core theme of Diodorus' work, motivated by his own experience as a subject of Rome.

This book covers the height of the Spartan rule in Greece, including the invasion of Persia, the Olynthian War, and the occupation of the Cadmeia (8-12, 18-23), but also the Spartan defeat in the Boeotian War which resulted in the rise of the Theban Hegemony (25-35, 37–40,  62‑69, 75, 82‑88). The main side narratives are Euagoras war with the Persians in Cyprus (2‑4, 8‑9), the wars of Dionysius I against the Illyrians, Etruscans and Carthaginians and his death (13-17, 73-74), Artaxerxes II's failed invasion of Egypt (41-43), the skytalismos in Argos (57-58), the career of Jason of Pherae (57, 60, 80, 95), and the Great Satraps' Revolt (90-93).

Diodorus' main source is generally believed to have been Ephorus, but (through him?) he also seems to have drawn on other sources, like the Hellenica Oxyrhynchia. It is disputed whether he continued using Timaeus of Tauromenium for his description of Sicilian affairs in this book or if this too was based on Ephorus.

Book XVI: 360‑336 BC
The Prologue announces the importance of cohesion within narratives - a book or chapter should, if possible, narrate an entire story from start to finish. It then transitions into praise of Philip II, whose involvement in the Third Sacred War and resulting rise are the main subjects of the book.

The principal side narratives are Dion of Syracuse's overthrow of Dionysius II (5-6, 9-15), the Social War (7, 21-22), Artaxerxes III's reconquest of Egypt (40-52), and the expedition of Timoleon (interleaved in 65-90).

The initial sources for the main narrative was probably Ephorus, but his account came to an end in 356 BC, and Diodorus' sources after that point are disputed. Possibilities include Demophilus, Diyllus, Duris of Samos and Theopompus; contradictions in his account suggest that he was following multiple sources simultaneously and did not succeed in combining them perfectly. The Sicilian material probably draws on Timaeus and also cites .

Book XVII: 335‑324 BC
This book covers Alexander the Great from his accession, through his campaigns in Persia, to his death in Babylon. Despite a promise in the brief prologue to discuss other contemporary events, it does not contain any side-narratives, although, unlike other accounts of Alexander, it does mention Macedonian activities in Greece during his expedition. Owing to its length, the book is split into two halves, the first running down to the Battle of Gaugamela (1-63) and the second part continuing until his death (64-118).

Diodorus' sources for the story of Alexander are much debated. Sources of information include Aristobulus of Cassandreia, Cleitarchus, Onesicritus and Nearchus, but it is not clear that he used these directly. Several scholars have argued that the unity of this account implies a single source, perhaps Cleitarchus.

Book XVIII: 323-318 BC
This book covers the years 323 BC-318 BC, describing the disputes which arose between Alexander's generals after his death and the beginning of the Wars of the Diadochoi. The account is largely based on Hieronymus of Cardia. There is no discussion of events outside the eastern Mediterranean, although cross-references at other points indicate that Diodorus intended to discuss Sicilian affairs.

Book XIX: 317-311 BC
This book opens with a prologue arguing that democracy is usually overthrown by the most powerful members of society, not the weakest, and advancing Agathocles of Syracuse as a demonstration of this proposition.

The narrative of the book continues the account of the Diadochi, recounting the Second and Third Wars of the Diadochi; the Babylonian War is completely unmentioned. Interwoven in this narrative is the rise to power of Agathocles of Syracuse and the beginning of his war with Carthage. It is disputed whether this latter narrative strand is based on Callias of Syracuse, Timaeus of Tauromenium, or Duris of Samos.

Book XX: 310-302 BC 
The prologue of this book discusses Greek historians' practice of inventing speeches for their characters to deliver. Diodorus criticises the practice as inappropriate to the genre, but acknowledges that in moderation such speeches can add variety and serve a didactic purpose.

The book is devoted to two parallel narratives, one describing Agathocles' ultimately unsuccessful invasion of Carthage, and the other devoted to the continued wars of the Diadochi, which are dominated by Antigonus Monophthalmus and Demetrius Poliorcetes. The only significant side narrative is the account of Cleonymus of Sparta's wars in Italy (104-105).

Books XXI–XL 
These books do not survive intact, but large sections were preserved by Byzantine compilers working under Constantine VII and by epitomators like Photius. They covered the history of the Hellenistic kingdoms from the Battle of Ipsus in 301 BC, through the wars between Rome and Carthage, down to either 60 BC or the beginning of Caesar's Gallic War in 59 BC.

For books 21–32, Diodorus drew on the history of Polybius, which largely survives and can be compared against Diodorus' text, though he may also have used Philinus of Agrigentum and other lost historians. Books 32 to 38 or 39 probably had Poseidonius as their source.

Book XXXII is notable for the inclusion of the lives of Diophantus of Abae, Callon of Epidaurus, and others who transitioned between genders. The record of Callon's medical treatment is the first known account of gender affirmation surgery.

Reception

Ancient and medieval

Diodorus is mentioned briefly in Pliny the Elder's Natural History as being singular among the Greek historians for the simple manner in which he named his work.

Modern

Diodorus' liberal use of earlier historians underlies the harsh opinion of the author of the 1911 Encyclopædia Britannica article on Bibliotheca historica:

As damaging as this sounds, other more contemporary classical scholars are likely to go even further. Diodorus has become infamous particularly for adapting his tales ad maiorem Graecorum gloriam ("to the greater glory of the Greeks"), leading one prominent author to refer to him as one of the "two most accomplished liars of antiquity" (the other being Ctesias).

Far more sympathetic is the estimate of C.H. Oldfather, who wrote in the introduction to his translation of Diodorus:

Editorial history
The earliest extant manuscript of Bibliotheca historica is from about 10th century.
The editio princeps of Diodorus was a Latin translation of the first five books by Poggio Bracciolini at Bologna in 1472. The first printing of the Greek original (at Basel in 1535) contained only books 16–20, and was the work of Vincentius Opsopoeus. It was not until 1559 that all of the surviving books, and surviving fragments of books 21 to the end were published by Stephanus at Geneva.

Editions and translations

Vol. 2 (Books 2.35-4.58). Tr. C. H. Oldfather. LCL 303 (1935). . Online: Internet Archive PDF
Vol. 3 (Books 4.59-8). Tr. C. H. Oldfather. LCL 340 (1939). .
Vol. 4 (Books 9-12.40). Tr. C. H. Oldfather. LCL 375 (1946). . Online: Perseus
Vol. 5 (Books 12.41-13). Tr. C. H. Oldfather. LCL 384 (1950). .
Vol. 6 (Books 14–15.19). Tr. C. H. Oldfather. LCL 399 (1954). .
Vol. 7 (Books 15.20-16.65). Tr. Charles L. Sherman. LCL 389 (1952). .

Vol. 9 (Books 18–19.65). Tr. Russel M. Geer. LCL 377 (1947). .
Vol. 10 (Books 19.66-20). Tr. Russel M. Geer. LCL 390 (1954). .
Vol. 11 (Fragments of Books 21-32). Tr. Francis R. Walton. LCL 409 (1957). .
Vol. 12 (Fragments of Books 33-40). Tr. Francis R. Walton. LCL 423 (1967). .
 Available from Internet Archive
 
 

Footnotes

References

Further reading

Sacks, Kenneth S. Diodorus Siculus and the First Century''. Princeton: Princeton University Press, 1990. .
  and

External links

 Diodorus Siculus translated by C.H. Oldfather, English translation, Greek text, Books 9–17 (text)
 Diodorus Siculus translated by C.H. Oldfather, English translation, Book 4 (text)
 The manuscripts of Diodorus Siculus by Roger Pearse (list only)
 Bibliotheca Historica (books 1-32), Bill Thayer's Web Site
 Bibliotheca Historica (books 33-40), Attalus.org

Ancient Greek works
Books about civilizations
1st-century BC history books
History of mining
Gold mining
Roman-era Greek historiography